Cophoscincopus (common name: keeled water skinks) is a genus of skinks, lizards in the family Scincidae. The genus is  endemic to West Africa. As suggested by the common name, species in the genus Cophoscincopus are semi-aquatic.

Species
There are four recognized species in the genus Cophoscincopus.
Cophoscincopus durus 
Cophoscincopus greeri 
Cophoscincopus senegalensis 
Cophoscincopus simulans 

Nota bene: A binomial authority in parentheses indicates that the species was originally described in a genus other than Cophoscincopus.

References

Further reading
Mertens R (1934). "Die Inseln-Reptilien, ihre Ausbreitung, Variation und Artbildung ". Zoologica Stuttgart 32 (84): 1–209. (in German).

 
Lizard genera
Taxa named by Robert Mertens